Notomulciber albosetosus is a species of beetle in the family Cerambycidae. It was described by Heller in 1923. It is known from Borneo.

References

Homonoeini
Beetles described in 1923